Salaparuta is a town and comune in South-Western Sicily, Italy, in the valley of the Belice river, administratively part of the province of Trapani.

In 1968, the original site of the town was near the epicentre of the Belice Valley earthquake. As a result, Salaparuta was completely destroyed and rebuilt not far from the original location. The current Salaparuta is still home to many of the citizens of the old town.

Salaparuta is popularly known for its Salaparuta DOC wine production, also the main income source for the town.

References 

Municipalities of the Province of Trapani
Cities destroyed by earthquakes